60 Andromedae (abbreviated 60 And) is a star system in the northern constellation of Andromeda, located to the west-northwest of Gamma Andromedae. 60 Andromedae is the Flamsteed designation though the star also bears the Bayer designation b Andromedae. It is bright enough to be seen by the naked eye with an apparent visual magnitude of 4.82.

This system is known to have three components. The secondary component is likely a white dwarf with a period of 748.2 days and an eccentricity of 0.34. There is a third component at an angular separation of 0.22 arcseconds.

References

External links
 

Andromeda (constellation)
Spectroscopic binaries
Andromedae, b
Andromedae, 60
K-type giants
Triple star systems
Durchmusterung objects
013520
010340
0643